Park Kyung-Hwan (born December 29, 1976) is a former South Korean football player.

References 

Park Kyung-hwan

1976 births
Living people
South Korean footballers
South Korean expatriate footballers
Shonan Bellmare players
Jeonbuk Hyundai Motors players
Daegu FC players
Pohang Steelers players
J1 League players
K League 1 players
Expatriate footballers in Japan
South Korean expatriate sportspeople in Japan
Expatriate footballers in Germany
South Korean expatriate sportspeople in Germany
Korea University alumni
Association football defenders